Emma Lewis (1931–2013) was a Native American potter from the Acoma Pueblo. She was the daughter of the potter Lucy M. Lewis.

Her work is included in the collections of the Seattle Art Museum, the Peabody Museum of Archaeology and Ethnology and the Brooklyn Museum.

References

1931 births
2013 deaths
20th-century American women artists
21st-century American women artists
Native American artists
20th-century Native American women
20th-century Native Americans
21st-century Native American women
21st-century Native Americans
People from Acoma Pueblo
Artists from New Mexico